Glucosone is a reactive carbonyl compound that can be produced by an Amadori rearrangement of a derivative of glucose. It is a dicarbonyl intermediate of the Maillard reaction whose production is higher under oxidative versus non-oxidative conditions.

References

Glucose